Miss World 1983, the 33rd edition of the Miss World pageant, was held on 17 November 1983 at the Royal Albert Hall in London, UK. The winner was Sarah-Jane Hutt from United Kingdom. She was crowned by Miss World 1982, Mariasela Álvarez of Dominican Republic. First runner-up was Rocío Isabel Luna representing Colombia and second runner-up was Cátia Pedrosa from Brazil. Miss World 1983 marked the first Miss World event that included an intelligence test for contestants. The intelligence test was created by psychologists.

Results

Placements

Continental Queens of Beauty

Contestants

Judges

 Eric Morley † 
 Plácido Domingo
 Michael Edelson 
 Bruce Forsyth † 
 Ralph Halpern † 
 Mazusaku Kawasaki
 Wilnelia Merced – Miss World 1975 from Puerto Rico
 Lynsey de Paul † 
 Jeff Set

Notes

Debuts

Returns

Last competed in 1970:
 
Last competed in 1972:
 
Last competed in 1975:
 
Last competed in 1980:
 
Last competed in 1981:

Withdrawals
  – Fiona Wickremesinghe (personal reasons)

References

External links
 Pageantopolis – Miss World 1983

Miss World
1983 in London
1983 beauty pageants
Beauty pageants in the United Kingdom
Events at the Royal Albert Hall
November 1983 events in the United Kingdom